There have been three baronetcies created for persons with the surname Hewett, one in the Baronetage of England and two in the Baronetage of the United Kingdom.

The Hewett Baronetcy, of Pishiobury in the County of Hertford, was created in the Baronetage of England on 19 July 1660. For more information on this creation, see the Viscount Hewett.

The Hewett Baronetcy, of Nether Seale in the County of Leicester, was created in the Baronetage of the United Kingdom on 6 November 1813 for General George Hewett, Commander-in-Chief of the Forces in India in 1807. The second baronet was a colonel in the army and served in the Peninsular War.

The Hewett Baronetcy, of Chesterfield Street, in the parish of St George, Hanover Square in the County of Middlesex, was created in the Baronetage of the United Kingdom on 6 August 1883 for Prescott Gardner Hewett, a surgeon.

Hewett baronets, of Pishiobury (1660)
see the Viscount Hewett

Hewett baronets, of Nether Seale (1813)
Sir George Hewett, 1st Baronet (1750–1840)
Sir George Henry Hewett, 2nd Baronet (1791–1862)
Sir George John Routledge Hewett, 3rd Baronet (1818–1876)
Sir Harald George Hewett, 4th Baronet (1858–1949)
Sir John George Hewett, MC, 5th Baronet (1895–1990)
Sir Peter John Smithson Hewett, 6th Baronet (1931–2001)
Sir Richard Mark John Hewett, 7th Baronet (born 1958)

The heir presumptive to the baronetcy is David Patrick John Hewett (born 1968), 2nd and youngest son of the 6th Baronet.

The heir presumptive's heir apparent is his eldest son, Hector Alexander Hewett (born 1999).

Hewett baronets, of Chesterfield Street, London (1883)
Sir Prescott Gardner Hewett, 1st Baronet (1812–1891)						
Sir Harry Hammerton Hewett, 2nd Baronet (1853–1891) Extinct on his death

References

Kidd, Charles, Williamson, David (editors). Debrett's Peerage and Baronetage (1990 edition). New York: St Martin's Press, 1990.

Baronetcies in the Baronetage of the United Kingdom
Extinct baronetcies in the Baronetage of England
Extinct baronetcies in the Baronetage of the United Kingdom